Christian Aguilera (born November 25, 1991) is an American mixed martial artist who competes in the Welterweight division. He formerly fought in the Ultimate Fighting Championship.

Background
Growing up, Aguilera did a little bit of taekwondo and was obsessed with fighting and obsessed with boxing. He started playing hockey, as it was the only major sport with fighting allowed. He played hockey for two years at Northwood School in Lake Placid, New York and had ambitions to play college hockey and then NHL, but they didn't pan out.

Mixed martial arts career

Early career
Starting his career in 2013, Aguilera fought in LFA, RFA, BAMMA, King of the Cage among others.

Aguilera made his LFA debut at LFA 30 on January 12, 2018, against future LFA Welterweight champion Maycon Mendonça. He won the bout less than 30 seconds into the bout by knocking out Maycon.

After picking up a submission win in King of the Cage. Aguilera returned to LFA to face Ricardo Seixas on March 23, 2018, at LFA 36. He won the bout via knockout again this time in the second round.

Aguilera faced Matthew Frincu on June 29, 2018, at LFA 44. He lost the three round war via unanimous decision.

Aguilera faced former UFC fighter David Michaud on February 2, 2019, at LFA 59. He lost the bout via TKO in the second round.

After picking up a TKO win in the Celtic Gladiator promotion, Aguilera returned to LFA to face Glaucio Eliziario on January 31, 2020, at LFA 81. He won the bout via unanimous decision.

Ultimate Fighting Championship
Aguilera made his UFC debut against Anthony Ivy on June 13, 2020, at UFC on ESPN: Eye vs. Calvillo. Aguilera won the fight via TKO less than a minute into the bout. This win earned him the Performance of the Night award.

Aguilera faced Sean Brady at UFC Fight Night: Smith vs. Rakić on August 29, 2020. Helost the fight via a guillotine choke in round two.

Aguilera was expected to face Warlley Alves on January 16, 2021, at UFC on ABC: Holloway vs. Kattar.  However, Aguilera pulled out in late December due to an injury.

Aguilera faced Carlston Harris on May 8, 2021, at UFC on ESPN: Rodriguez vs. Waterson. He lost the bout via technical submission due to an anaconda choke as he was choked unconscious in the first round.

On May 8, 2021, it was announced that Aguilera was released from the UFC.

Post UFC 
Aguilera was scheduled to face Battlefield Fight League's welterweight champion Dejan Kajic on October 1, 2021, at BFL 69. However, Aguilera pulled out due to injury.

Championships and accomplishments 

 Ultimate Fighting Championship
 Performance of the Night (One time)

Mixed martial arts record

|-
| Loss
| align=center| 14–8
| Carlston Harris
| Technical Submission (anaconda choke)
| UFC on ESPN: Rodriguez vs. Waterson
| 
| align=center| 1
| align=center| 2:52
| Las Vegas, Nevada, United States
| 
|-
| Loss
| align=center|14–7
| Sean Brady
| Technical Submission (guillotine choke)
| UFC Fight Night: Smith vs. Rakić
| 
| align=center|2
| align=center|1:47
| Las Vegas, Nevada, United States
| 
|-
| Win
| align=center| 14–6
| Anthony Ivy
| TKO (punches)
| UFC on ESPN: Eye vs. Calvillo
|
|align=Center|1
|align=center|0:59
|Las Vegas, Nevada, United States
| 
|-
| Win
| align=center| 13–6
| Glaucio Eliziario
| Decision (unanimous)
| LFA 81
| 
| align=center| 3
| align=center| 5:00
| Costa Mesa, California, United States
| 
|-
| Win
| align=center| 12–6
| Krzysztof Kulak
| TKO (strikes)
|  Celtic Gladiator 25
| 
| align=center| 1
| align=center| 2:36
| Burbank, California, United States
| 
|-
| Loss
| align=center| 11–6
| David Michaud
| TKO (punches)
| LFA 59
| 
| align=center| 1
| align=center| 4:14
| Phoenix, Arizona, United States
| 
|-
| Loss
| align=center| 11–5
| Matthew Frincu
| Decision (unanimous)
|LFA 44
|
|align=center|3
|align=center|5:00
|Phoenix, Arizona, United States
|
|-
| Win
| align=center| 11–4
| Ricardo Seixas
| KO (punch)
|LFA 36
|
|align=center|2
|align=center|1:47
|Cabazon, California, United States
| 
|-
| Win
| align=center| 10–4
| Anthony Hernandez
| TKO (submission to punches)
|KOTC: Energetic Pursuit
|
|align=center|1 
|align=center|2:57
|Ontario, California, United States
|
|-
| Win
| align=center| 9–4
| Maycon Mendonça
|KO (punch)
|LFA 30
|
|align=center|1
|align=center|0:27
|Costa Mesa, California, United States
|
|-
| Loss
| align=center| 8–4
| Richard LeRoy
| KO
| CXF 10
| 
| align=center| 1
| align=center| 1:56
| Studio City, California, United States
|
|-
| Win
| align=center|8–3
| Joshua Jones
| KO (punch)
| CXF 9
| 
| align=center|1
| align=center|0:40
| Studio City, California, United States
|
|-
| Loss
| align=center|7–3
| Matt Sayles
|TKO (punches)
|CFFC 64: Sayles vs. Aguilera
|
|align=center|1
|align=center|1:51
|San Diego, California, United States
|
|-
| Win
| align=center|7–2
| Chris Padilla
| Decision (unanimous)
|KOTC: Warranted Aggression
| 
| align=center|3
| align=center|5:00
| Ontario, California, United States
|
|-
| Win
| align=center|6–2
| Tom Gloudeman
|TKO (punches)
| BAMMA Badbeat 20
| 
| align=center|1
| align=center|0:20
| Commerce, California, United States
|
|-
| Loss
| align=center| 5–2
| Nick Piedmont
| Decision (split)
| Smash Global: The Main Event 3
| 
| align=center| 3
| align=center| 5:00
| Los Angeles, California, United States
| 
|-
| Loss
| align=center| 5–1
| Darren Smith Jr.
| TKO (punches)
| BAMMA Badbeat 17
|
|align=Center|1
|align=center|3:08
|Commerce, California, United States
| 
|-
| Win
| align=center| 5–0
| Danny Navarro
| KO (punches)
| BAMMA Badbeat 16
| 
| align=center| 1
| align=center| 3:16
|Commerce, California, United States
| 
|-
| Win
| align=center| 4–0
| Tim Quiroga
| TKO (punches)
|RFA 23
|
|align=center|1
|align=center|0:52
|Costa Mesa, California, United States
| 
|-
| Win
| align=center| 3–0
| Eric Steans
| KO (punch)
| BAMMA Badbeat 13
| 
| align=center| 1
| align=center| 0:51
| Commerce, California, United States
| 
|-
| Win
| align=center| 2–0
| Kory Kelley
| KO (punches)
| BAMMA Badbeat 12
| 
| align=center| 1
| align=center| 2:05
| Commerce, California, United States
|
|-
| Win
| align=center| 1–0
| Blake Belshe
| Decision (split)
| BAMMA Badbeat 11
| 
| align=center| 3
| align=center| 3:00
| Commerce, California, United States
|

See also 
 List of male mixed martial artists

References

External links 
  
 

1991 births
Living people
American male mixed martial artists
Welterweight mixed martial artists
Sportspeople from Whittier, California
Mixed martial artists from California
Ultimate Fighting Championship male fighters